Precious Victims is a 1993 American television film directed by Peter Levin and starring Park Overall, Robby Benson and Frederic Forrest.  It is based on the book of the same name by Charles Bosworth Jr. and Don W. Weber.

Cast
Park Overall as Paula Sims
Robby Benson as Robert Sims
Frederic Forrest as Sheriff Frank Yocom
Brion James as Agent Jimmy Bivens
Cliff DeYoung as Don Groshong
Robyn Lively as Wendy McBride
Nancy Cartwright as Ruth Potter
Eileen Brennan as Minnie Gray
 Richard Thomas as Don Weber

Production
Filming occurred in Los Angeles.

Reception
Maj Canton of Radio Times awarded the film three stars out of five.

References

External links
 
 

1993 television films
1993 films
CBS network films
Films based on non-fiction books
Films shot in Los Angeles
1990s English-language films
Films directed by Peter Levin